Comedians of Life is a 1924 German silent film directed by Georg Jacoby and starring Elga Brink, Georg Alexander and Bruno Kastner.

The film's art direction was by Ludwig Kainer.

Cast
Elga Brink
Georg Alexander
Bruno Kastner
Bob-Roy
Martin Herzberg
Edith Meller
Paul Otto
Lona Schmidt
Willy Schröder

References

External links

Films of the Weimar Republic
German silent feature films
German black-and-white films
Films directed by Georg Jacoby
1920s German films